Isaiah Eleven is a novel written by Jesse Childs and published by Research Associates School Times Publishing.

Isaiah Eleven is based on the life experiences of the author. It is the first in a trilogy of books called the Isaiah Chronicles. The book is set in Chicago during the early 21st century. The novel deals with themes of identity in a world after the attacks of September 11, 2001 in the United States, and the struggle of one youth to become a man while attending an elite college. The title character, Isaiah, comes from a troubled background and has found it difficult being on his own. The results of a DNA paternity test have shown Isaiah who his birth father is and the book discusses how this situation evolves.

See also 
American literary regionalism
Culture of the United States

References 
Isaiah Eleven, Childs, Jesse. Chicago, Research Associates School Times Publications. 2008.

External links 
Isaiah Eleven at Amazon.com

African-American novels
2008 American novels
Novels set in Chicago